"Right Back Where We Started From" is a song written by Pierre Tubbs and J. Vincent Edwards, which was first recorded in the middle of 1975 by Maxine Nightingale for whom it was an international hit. In 1989, a remake by Sinitta reached No. 4 on the UK Singles Chart. The music features a significant repetitive sample from the song "Goodbye, Nothing to Say", written by Stephen Jameson and Marshall Doctores, which was recorded first by Jameson under the name of Nosmo King, and then by the Javells featuring Nosmo King (UK #26), both in 1974.

Maxine Nightingale version

In the UK
In a 3 May 2008 interview with Michael Shelley of WFMU, Edwards recalled that after hearing Maxine Nightingale sing on the session for Al Matthews' "Fool" that track's producer Pierre Tubbs had come up with "Right Back Where We Started From" as a good title for a song for Nightingale herself to record and had invited Edwards to co-write the song. Utilizing a tune which Edwards had written "a couple of years before", Tubbs and Edwards wrote "Right Back Where We Started From" in about seven minutes while driving to Charing Cross Hospital where Tubbs' wife Gabrielle (née Zimmerman) was set to give birth to Tubbs' daughter Nadine. The song heavily reflects Edwards' admiration for the Motown songwriting team of Holland–Dozier–Holland.  A rough demo featuring Edwards' vocal was cut the next day and it was Edwards, who had performed with Nightingale in the West End production of Hair, who approached Nightingale with an offer for her to record the song.

Nightingale recorded "Right Back Where We Started From" within a week of Edwards offering her the song, although she had initially refused, succumbing to Edwards' persuasion only on the condition that the track be released under a pseudonym. Edwards also had to convince Nightingale to accept a royalty payment rather than a one-time session fee equivalent to US$45. "Right Back Where We Started From" would ultimately be released in Nightingale's real name; she would also be awarded a more substantial royalty than she had agreed to. According to Edwards, consideration was given to "Right Back Where We Started From" being recorded as a duet featuring Nightingale and himself, but this possibility ended when Private Stock Records recruited Edwards to cut a remake of "The Worst That Could Happen". Nightingale had opined to Rolling Stone that Edwards' vocal on the demo was "pretty horrendous".

"Right Back Where We Started From" was recorded at Central Sound Studio a small demo studio on Denmark Street near Soho. Personnel on the session included two former members of the Electric Light Orchestra, bass guitarist Mike de Albuquerque  and violinist Wilfred Gibson (who did the strings arrangement). In the WFMU interview, Edwards identified other players on the session as drummer Pete Kircher and keyboardist Dave Rowberry. Also, Tubbs played guitar and Edwards provided percussion. Nightingale would advise Rolling Stone that she had disliked Tubbs's utilization of both a crashing keyboard arrangement and heavy hand claps; she was also discomforted by being required to sing in a higher key than she was accustomed to.

Mike de Albuquerque recalled, "We were doing...one of those demo sessions where everybody goes and sits down with music in front of you and you try and get through as many tunes as possible....I remember [Pierre Tubbs]...saying, listen guys, I want to record in entirety four pieces in this three hour session...and we recorded two pieces with Maxine and two with somebody else....[Let] me stress, it was a demo session that this multi million selling thing came out of, it wasn't let's go and remake it... it was the original demo session....[That] multi million selling recording, I would think, cost [Tubbs] less than a £100 if you put the other tracks into the pudding".

Released within two weeks of its recording by United Artists, who employed Tubbs in its art department, "Right Back Where We Started From" broke in the London discos and reached #8 on the UK Singles Chart dated 29 November 1975.

In the US
United Artists issued "Right Back Where We Started From" in the US in January 1976, and the single entered the charts in February to rise as high as #2 on the Billboard Hot 100 on 1 May 1976. Although "Right Back Where We Started From" was held off from the top of that chart for two weeks (by the Bellamy Brothers' "Let Your Love Flow", then John Sebastian's "Welcome Back"), the single did reach #1 on the charts for the two other major US music industry journals, Cash Box and Record World. On 27 April, the single received gold certification for sales of a million units.

"Right Back Where We Started From" also appeared on Billboards Adult Contemporary and Black Singles charts at #5 and #46, respectively.

Following the single's US success, Nightingale completed a Right Back Where We Started From album with Tubbs producing; Billboard ranked the album at #65.

Personnel
Maxine Nightingale: lead & backing vocals
Pierre Tubbs: guitars, Elka synthesizer, percussion, backing vocals
Mike de Albuquerque: bass
Pete Kircher: drums
Al Matthews, Pete Kircher: backing vocals
Peter Hughes: baritone saxophone
Vince Edwards: percussion, backing vocals

Charts

Weekly charts

Year-end charts

All-time charts

Soundtrack appearances
"Right Back Where We Started From" was prominently featured in the 1977 film Slap Shot, during the scenes where the Charlestown Chiefs hockey team are traveling on their bus, and during the end credits. The VHS release of Slap Shot replaced "Right Back Where We Started From", and all other songs featured in the film, with stock music due to licensing issues. When Slap Shot was released on DVD in 2002, the original songs were restored. In the premiere episode of the HBO series 24/7, which focused on the 2011 NHL Winter Classic, "Right Back Where We Started From" was played over footage of the Pittsburgh Penguins traveling to the game, as an homage to Slap Shot. As a similar homage, the song is played after home wins by both the New York Islanders and the Toronto Maple Leafs, while the New York Rangers played the song in their locker room after home wins during the 2013-14 season. TD Garden organist Ron Poster occasionally plays the song during Boston Bruins games, and The Hanson Brothers (who were named after a group of characters in Slap Shot) recorded a punk rock version of the song for the soundtrack of Slap Shot 3: The Junior League, under the title "Get it Right Back".

Other film appearances include The World Is Full of Married Men, Slums of Beverly Hills, Whatever Happened to Harold Smith?, Starsky and Hutch, Yours, Mine and Ours, The Family Stone, College Road Trip, An Extremely Goofy Movie (covered by Cleopatra), Shrek Forever After and Parental Guidance. It also appears in the second season premiere of the Netflix series The Umbrella Academy.

The Walt Disney Company used the song as part of their D-TV music video series. The music video featured clips from the Disney cartoons Hold That Pose and Donald's Camera.

Sinitta version

A 1989 remake of "Right Back Where We Started From" was released by American-born British pop/R&B singer Sinitta and included on her second album, Wicked (1989). It was released as the album's second single in June 1989, reaching number two in New Zealand, number four in the UK, number five in Ireland, number seven in Australia and Finland, number 12 in Denmark, number 25 in West Germany and number 17 in Spain. Sinitta's "Right Back Where We Started From" also reached number 48 in the Netherlands and became the singer's only charting single in her native US reaching number 84 on Billboard's Hot 100 and number 48 on the magazine's Hot Dance Chart (Maxi-single sales). It was certified silver by the BPI.

Critical reception
Bill Coleman from Billboard concluded that the song "could be the club kitten's biggest hit in the States. Already a smash in the U.K., this bubble-gum, hi-NRG/pop cover of Maxine Nightingale's late '70s hit has smash potential." Pan-European magazine Music & Media stated that the "cheerful" cover "will undoubtedly do well across the Continent." Sylvia Patterson from Smash Hits wrote, "This is hardly a radical interpration of the original, except that it's a bit faster (due to the Stocks' contribution) and not as well sung (due to Sinitta's). Still, it always was a supreme disco classic and it would take a right duffer to mess this one up."

Formats and track listings
 7" single
"Right Back Where We Started From" - 3:16
"I Just Can't Help It" - 3:43

 12" single
"Right Back Where We Started From" (Left Back On The Side Mix) - 7:12
"I Just Can't Help It" - 3:43
"Right Back Where We Started From" - 3:16

Right Back Where We Started From served as the title cut for a Sinitta retrospective released in 2009.

Charts

Weekly charts

Year-end charts

Other versions
 Celly Campello included a Portuguese rendering of the song: "Vamos começar tudo outra vez", on her 1976 eponymous album.
 Anita Sarawak recorded the song for her 1976 album Sophisticated Lady.
 Birgitta Wollgård recorded the song for her 1978 album Ställd Mot Väggen.
  A Dutch rendering: "Jij maakt mij stapelgek", was introduced in 1991 by Flemish singer Sylviane [Coigné]: Bouke remade the song for his 2008 In mijn gedachten album. Another Dutch rendering: "Een, twee, drie", recorded by Bart Kaëll, reached #32 on the Dutch charts in Belgium in 1995.
 Marcia Hines' 1996 album Discotheque - composed of covers of classic dance hits - included a remake of "Right Back Where We Started From".
 The 2000 direct-to-video animated Walt Disney Pictures film An Extremely Goofy Movie featured a cover of "Right Back Where We Started From" by Cleopatra.  The Cleopatra cover was also later included on the soundtrack for the 2008 Disney film College Road Trip.
 Alternative rock band Lazlo Bane covered the song for their 2007 cover album Guilty Pleasures. However the title was changed to "Get Right Back".
 The 2008 self-titled debut album of indie rock band Army Navy, included a cover of the song as a bonus track. It was recently used in the Shrek Forever After teaser trailer. and also the featured in the trailer for Parental Guidance.
 The Jonas Brothers sampled the main riff of the song for their track "Keep It Real" on their 2009 album, Lines, Vines and Trying Times.
 René Froger recorded the song for his 2010 album Hollands Glorie.
 Dutch singer Johnny Valentino has a 20 February 2010 single release with a translation of "Right Back Where We Started From", entitled "Het Gaat Gebeuren" ("It will happen").
 Mark Kozelek, known for his work as Sun Kil Moon, released a cover on his 2013 covers album Like Rats.
 In 2012, The Chandler Travis Philharmonic recorded a version for the compilation album Super Hits Of The Seventies, a fundraiser for radio station WFMU.
In 2018, rapper Yung Gravy sampled the song in his song "Gravy Train".

References

External links
 Lyrics of this song
 

1975 singles
1976 singles
1989 singles
Maxine Nightingale songs
Sinitta songs
1975 songs
Disco songs
Fanfare Records singles
United Artists Records singles
Cashbox number-one singles
Songs written by Pierre Tubbs